Dinocephalians (terrible heads) are a clade of large-bodied early therapsids that flourished in the Early and Middle Permian between 279.5 and 260 million years ago (Ma), but became extinct during the Capitanian mass extinction event. Dinocephalians included herbivorous, carnivorous, and omnivorous forms. Many species had thickened skulls with many knobs and bony projections. Dinocephalians were the first non-mammalian therapsids to be scientifically described and their fossils are known from Russia, China, Brazil, South Africa, Zimbabwe, and Tanzania.

Description

Apart from the Biarmosuchians, the dinocephalians are the least advanced therapsids, although still uniquely specialised in their own way. They retain a number of primitive characteristics (e.g. no secondary palate, small dentary) shared with their pelycosaur ancestors, although they are also more advanced in possessing therapsid adaptations like the expansion of the ilium and more erect limbs. They include carnivorous, herbivorous, and omnivorous forms. Some were semiaquatic, others were fully terrestrial. They were among the largest animals of the Permian period; only the biggest Caseidae and Pareiasauridea reaching them in size.

Size
Dinocephalians were generally large.

Skull
All dinocephalians are distinguished by the interlocking incisor (front) teeth. Correlated features are the distinctly downturned facial region, a deep temporal region, and forwardly rotated suspensorium. Shearing contact between the upper and lower teeth (allowing food to be more easily sliced into small bits for digestion) is achieved through keeping a fixed quadrate and a hinge-like movement at the jaw articulation. The lower teeth are inclined forward, and occlusion is achieved by the interlocking of the incisors. The later dinocephalians improved on this system by developing heels on the lingual sides of the incisor teeth that met against one another to form a crushing surface when the jaws were shut.

Most dinocephalians also developed pachyostosis of the bones in the skull, which seems to have been an adaptation for intra-specific behaviour (head-butting), perhaps for territory or a mate. In some types, such as Estemmenosuchus and Styracocephalus, there are also horn-like structures, which evolved independently in each case.

Evolutionary history

The dinocephalians are an ancient group and their ancestry is not clear. It is assumed that they must have evolved during the earlier part of the Roadian, or possibly even the Kungurian epoch, but no trace has been found. These animals radiated at the expense of the dying pelycosaurs, who dominated during the early part of the Permian and may have even gone extinct due to competition with therapsids, especially the short-lived but most dominant dinocephalians. Even the earliest members, the estemmenosuchids and early brithopodids of the Russian Ocher fauna, were already a diverse group of herbivores and carnivores.

During the Wordian and early Capitanian, advanced dinocephalians radiated into a large number of herbivorous forms, representing a diverse megafauna. This is well known from the Tapinocephalus Assemblage Zone of the Southern African Karoo.

At the height of their diversity (middle or late Capitanian age) all the dinocephalians suddenly died out, during the Capitanian mass extinction event. The reason for their extinction is not clear; although disease, sudden climatic change, or other factors of environmental stress may have brought about their end. They were replaced by much smaller therapsids; herbivorous Dicynodontia and carnivorous Biarmosuchians, Gorgonopsians and Therocephalians.

Taxonomy 

 Class Synapsida
 Order Therapsida
 Suborder Dinocephalia
 ?Driveria
 ?Eccasaurus
 ?Mastersonia
 ?Pelosuchus
 ?Tappenosaurus
 Family Estemmenosuchidae
 Estemmenosuchus
 Molybdopygus
?Parabradysaurus
 ?Family Phreatosuchidae
 Phreatosaurus
 Phreatosuchus
 ?Family Phthinosuchidae
 Phthinosuchus
 ?Family Rhopalodontidae
?Phthinosaurus
Rhopalodon
 Clade Anteosauria
 Family Anteosauridae
 Family Brithopodidae
 Family Deuterosauridae
 Clade Tapinocephalia
 ?Dimacrodon
 Family ?Driveriidae
 Family ?Mastersoniidae
 Family Styracocephalidae
 Family Tapinocephalidae
 Family Titanosuchidae

See also
 Evolution of mammals
List of Permian tetrapods

References

Further reading
Carroll, R. L. (1988), Vertebrate Paleontology and Evolution, WH Freeman & Co.

External links
Dinocephalia at Palaeos
Dinocephalia at Palaeocritti

 
Taxa named by Harry Seeley
Guadalupian first appearances
Guadalupian extinctions